The German rock band Solar Project was founded in 1988. Their
musical style is categorized best as Art rock or Progressive rock.

History

Solar Project was started in 1988 by Robert Valet, Volker
Janacek and Peter Terhoeven as a studio project. The debut album was
published in 1990 and until 2007 further six albums followed, which
are distributed by the French record label Musea. In addition
Solar Project contributed to Pink Floyd tribute albums with cover
versions. Since 2014 new albums and re-releases will be published by New Music - Green Tree.

Musicians
 Holger vom Bruch: vocals 
 Sandra Baetzel: Saxophone, Keyboards & vocals
 Florian Schlott: drums 
 Sebastian Jungermann: Bass guitar
 Peter Terhoeven: Guitar
 Robert Valet: Keyboards
 Guest musicians

Discography

Albums
 1990: The final solution
 1992: World Games
 1995: The House of S. Phrenia
 1997: ...in Time
 2001: Five
 2004: Force Majeure
 2007: Chromagnitude
 2007: Best of Solar Project (Vinyl)
 2014: Aquarmada
 2015: Here I Am
 2015: EMP & The final solution (2CD)
 2016: Paranoia
 2018: Utopia
 2020: Ghost Lights
 2022: Restless

Samplers
 2000: Signs of Life - Pigs
 2002: More Relics - Echoes

References

External links
Solar Project discography on discogs.com

German progressive rock groups